Honko  is a surname. Notable people:

 Jaakko Honko (1922-2006), Finnish business economist
 Lauri Honko (1932-2002), professor of folklore studies and comparative religion.